On the medial part of the clavicle is a broad rough surface, the costal tuberosity (rhomboid impression), rather more than 2 cm. in length, for the attachment of the costoclavicular ligament. The rest of this surface is occupied by a groove, which gives attachment to the Subclavius; the coracoclavicular fascia, which splits to enclose the muscle, is attached to the margins of the groove. Not infrequently this groove is subdivided longitudinally by a line which gives attachment to the intermuscular septum of the Subclavius.

References

External links
 Definition at drugs.com

Clavicle